György Magyar (born 23 October 1949) is a Hungarian lawyer, politician and university teacher. He has served as Vice Chairman of the Everybody's Hungary Movement since 2018. 

In 1973, he graduated from the Faculty of Law of the Eötvös Loránd University. 

Magyar was the MP candidate of the MSZP–P coalition in the 4th constituency of Somogy County in the 2018 Hungarian parliamentary election. He received 11,221 votes (25.02%), and finished 2nd behind Mihály Witzmann of Fidesz.

Famous clients
 Attila Ambrus (the Whiskey Robber)
 Ramil Safarov (the Azeri Axe Murderer)

References

External links
 Introduction
 His profile at the Hungarian Socialist Party

1949 births
Living people
People from Budapest
20th-century Hungarian lawyers
Hungarian politicians
Eötvös Loránd University alumni